Ferrari 312 is the name of several different Ferrari race cars which have 3 litre 12-cylinder engines. This article is about the Formula One car raced in 1966–1969. Other cars with the same model number include the 312B, 312T F1 cars and the 312P and 312PB sportscars.

The Ferrari 312 F1 was the designation of the 3 litre V-12 (hence 312) Formula One cars raced by the Italian team from 1966 to 1969.

Overview

Naming 
Designed under the leadership of Mauro Forghieri, there were two distinct variations using this designation, the 1966 version and the completely different 1967-69 version. The '66 cars carried on the chassis numbering sequence from the previous year's 1.5 litre cars, while the '67 cars began a new sequence at "0001". To avoid confusion, the cars are commonly referred to as 312 F1-66, 312 F1-67 etc.

1966 
For the 1966 Formula One season, there was a change in the technical regulations, now allowing 3 litre engines. The F1 teams, even though asking for "the return to power", were more or less surprised and not well prepared.

Ferrari's first 1966 car consisted of a 3.3-litre V12 engine that was taken from the Ferrari 275P2 sportscar prototypes, modified to 3000cc, and mounted in the back of an F1 chassis. The designation 312, which would be used for a number of later cars, indicated a 3-litre, 12-cylinder engine. The engine was rather heavy, and due to the reduced capacity, lower on power and especially torque. John Surtees drove this contraption unsuccessfully in Monaco while Lorenzo Bandini drove a Ferrari Dino 2.4-litre V6. Surtees won the second race, the 1966 Belgian Grand Prix, a track that favoured power with its long straights, but the 1964 champion departed after a row with manager Eugenio Dragoni. The issue was about priorities in racing, as Ferrari was under pressure from Ford in sports car racing, and the F1 effort was somewhat neglected. Mike Parkes replaced Surtees, who went to Cooper which used Maserati engines, to finish second in the driver championship with a further win. For Ferrari, Ludovico Scarfiotti also won a race, the 1966 Italian Grand Prix at Monza which helped Ferrari finish second in the Constructors' Championship.

1967 
In 1967, the team fired Dragoni and replaced him with Franco Lini. Chris Amon partnered Bandini to drive a somewhat improved version of the 1966 V12 car. At the 1967 Monaco Grand Prix, Bandini crashed and suffered heavy injuries when he was trapped under his burning car; several days later he succumbed to his injuries. Ferrari re-hired Mike Parkes, but Parkes suffered career-ending injuries weeks later at the 1967 Belgian Grand Prix. Several accidents, a fatality, no race win, and only 5th in the Constructors' Championship marked a bad year for Ferrari. In addition, the new Ford Cosworth DFV engine that had its debut in the Lotus 49 would dominate F1 in the 15 years to come.

1968 

The 1968 season continued Ferrari's poor performance. New driver Jacky Ickx won the wet 1968 French Grand Prix, but had few other successes. Things became more complicated during the season due to the introduction of aerodynamic devices into F1, and their quick development. At the end of the season, Scuderia Ferrari finished 4th in the Constructors' Championship. Manager Franco Lini quit, and so did Ickx, moving to Brabham. To provide for the future, during the summer of 1968, Enzo Ferrari worked out a deal to sell his road car business to Fiat for $11 million; the transaction took place in early 1969, leaving 50% of the business still under control of Ferrari himself.

1969 
During 1969 Enzo Ferrari set about wisely spending his new-found wealth to revive his struggling team; though Ferrari did compete in Formula One in 1969, it was something of a throwaway season while the team was restructured. Amon continued to drive an older model and Pedro Rodríguez took Jacky Ickx's place; at the end of the year Amon left the team which once again had no race wins and was only ranked 5th in the Constructors' Championship.

The car was succeeded by the 312B which was introduced for the 1970 Formula One season.

Formula One World Championship results
(key) (results in bold indicate pole position; results in italics indicate fastest lap)

PC Simulation
In 1998, a drivable, detailed virtual recreation of the 1967 Ferrari 312 appeared as one of the leading cars in Grand Prix Legends (GPL), a PC-based simulation of the 1967 F1 championship. The 1966 version was part of a free 66 Mod for GPL, which was introduced in 2007. It included further refined driving physics. The 1968 and 1969 cars, which feature wings for added downforce, appear in the respective season mods as well. In 2017, the 1967 version was included in the Ferrari 70th Anniversary Celebration Pack for Assetto Corsa.

Popularity
In 2011, TheF1Times.com rated the 312 as being "the most beautiful Formula One car of all time", stating "Ferrari's 312 remains in some opinions as one of the most aesthetically-pleasing Formula One cars of not only the 1960s, but of all time."

References
Tremayne, David & Hughes, Mark (1998). "The Concise Encyclopedia Of Formula One'', Paragon.

External links
World Sportscar Championship Results

312